Rizal Special Education Learning Center, also known as Rizal Sped De La Salle, is a De La Salle-supervised school located in Davao Central.

History
	

In 1986 three educators thought of opening a school offering courses with their respective specialization: preschool, intellectually challenged, and hearing-Impaired education. The main goal of opening the Rizal Special Education Learning Center is to help educate pupils/students with special needs such as the hearing impaired, intellectually challenged, autistic, slow learners and fast learners. However, the need for regular atmosphere for eventual mainstreaming prompted the founders to open classes for regular pupils, thus, regular classes were opened with two grade levels every school year until Elementary Course was complete.

After nine years, it was observed that a lot of the graduate expressed their desires and sentiments to proceed with the secondary level in the same school. On the appeal of the parents, the concept was considered and realized.

The two levels in secondary Course were opened in 1995–1996. The following year attendance soared, which made it necessary to relocate from Rizal Sped, Davao City to the present site.

On January 18, 1996, the new building at Pardo de Tavera Street, Davao City, was inaugurated and upon the opening of the school year 1996-1997 all levels started to move classes in three thousand square meter campus. It was then, that the name of the school was changed to Rizal Special Education Learning Center.

in 1997–1998, Rizal Special Education Learning Center entered into another milestone under the auspices of La Salle Supervision Office. The school became a De La Salle Consultancy School in school year 1998-1999 and in school year 1999–2000, the school became a De La Salle-supervised school on probationary status. In February, 2002 the school has satisfactorily met the standards and fulfilled all the requirements for De La Salle Supervised Accredited Status for level I and level II in June 2005. The Federation of Accrediting Agencies of the Philippines granted Level I status to RSELC for having satisfactorily met the standards and fulfilled all the requirements of the Philippine Accrediting Association of Schools, Colleges and Universities (PAASCU) in June 2006.

The Rizal Sped Special Education Learning Center has the following courses offered: The Preschool Course with Government Recognition No. 001, s. 1990.
It is upon the principles adhered to by the founders and the promise of a more enhanced quality education that the institution endeavors to achieve its vision, mission and goals, and to actively take part in the development of the youth for a better society.

References

External links
 Partial list of La Salle schools & educational institutions throughout the archipelago
 De La Salle Supervised Schools

Schools in Davao City
Catholic elementary schools in the Philippines